The Kids are a Belgian punk rock band formed in 1976. They are Belgium's best known punk band and best remembered for their songs "Fascist Cops" (1978) and "There Will Be No Next Time" (1981). The band broke up in 1985 but reunited in 1996 for the soundtrack recording of the Belgian film Dief (Thief). They have been together ever since, playing concerts around the world.

History 

 1976: Inspired by the upcoming punk wave, Ludo Mariman and the De Haes brothers formed The Kids. Their bass player, Danny de Haes, is only 12 at the time (and not allowed in at some of their own concerts).
 1977: The Kids sign their first record contract with Phonogram. They play support acts for Iggy Pop and Patti Smith.
 1978: Their first album The Kids is recorded, and guitarist Luc van de Poel joins the band. They play at the famous Jazz Bilzen festival. Eight months later the second album Naughty Kids is released.
 1978–1984: The Kids play many concerts, win several Belgian polls, and record another 3 albums: Living in the 20th Century, Black Out (which includes their biggest Belgian hit "There Will Be No Next Time"), and a Live album, recorded with the Rolling Stones mobile studio.
 1985: The Kids release Gotcha!, their final studio album, just to split up shortly after.
 1996: The Kids reform and start touring again, playing concerts in France and Belgium, Italy, and Germany.
 2004: The Kids play their first concert in the USA, at Southpaw in Brooklyn. A DVD of this sold-out show is released under the title The Kids: Live in New York.
2005: The Kids play their first Canadian tour and play at a festival in Austin, Texas.
 2007: A box set collection including all previous the Kids albums is released.
 2008: The Kids play at the Lokerse Feesten Festival with the Sex Pistols, the New York Dolls, and the Buzzcocks.
 2008–2012: The kids play concerts in Canada, Japan, Spain, Switzerland, Holland, Germany, France, Italy, Sweden, Norway, etc.
2012: The band's line up changed, with Tim Jult as new drummer and Ief Vanlommel as new bassist.
2013: The Kids announce a US-Westcoast tour, including concerts in Portland, Seattle, San Francisco, Los Angeles, and San Diego.

Band members 
Original line-up
 Ludo Mariman – guitar, vocals
 Danny de Haes – bass
 Eddy de Haes – drums

Current line-up
 Ludo Mariman – guitar, vocals
 Ief Vanlommel – bass
 Luc van de Poel – guitar
 Tim Jult – drums

Discography 
 1978: The Kids
 1978: Naughty Kids
 1979: Living in the 20th Century
 1981: Black Out
 1982: If the Kids... (live)
 1985: Gotcha!
 2002: Flabbergasted! Live at AB
 2004: The Kids: Live in New York (DVD)
 2007: Anthology

References

External links 
 The Kids on Discogs

Belgian punk rock groups
Musical groups established in 1977
Musical groups disestablished in 1985